Mike Jopek is a former American politician from Montana. Jopek is a former Democratic Party member of the Montana House of Representatives, representing District 4 since 2004.

See also 
 Montana House of Representatives, District 4

References

External links
Follow the Money – Mike Jopek
2008 2006 2004 2002 campaign contributions

Democratic Party members of the Montana House of Representatives
1964 births
Living people
People from Whitefish, Montana
Politicians from Missoula, Montana
Farmers from Montana